A state firearm has been designated by nine States in the United States: Alaska, Arizona, Utah, Indiana, Kentucky, Pennsylvania, West Virginia, Tennessee, and Texas.

States
In March 2011, Utah adopted the M1911 pistol as its state firearm. This gun was designed by Ogden, Utah native John Browning.  The adoption was supported by Republican Utah State Representative Carl Wimmer, who said, "It does capture a portion of Utah's history" and "even bigger than that, it captures a portion of American history." The adoption was opposed by Democratic Utah State Representative Brian King who said, "When we are talking about a state symbol we would do well to come up with one that is more unifying than divisive and this is a very divisive symbol for obvious reasons. This is just a poor choice for a state symbol".

In April 2011, Arizona Governor Jan Brewer signed a bill into law which designated the Colt Single Action Army Revolver as Arizona's state firearm.

In March 2012, Indiana adopted the Grouseland rifle as its state firearm. This rifle is kept at Grouseland, the home of President William Henry Harrison and was made between 1803 and 1812 by John Small, who later became the first sheriff in the state. "This rifle and its maker are both integral parts of Indiana history, and as such, the rifle is worthy of its designation as the Indiana State Rifle," said Senator John Waterman.

In June 2013, Kentucky adopted the Kentucky long rifle as its state firearm.

In June 2014, Pennsylvania adopted the Pennsylvania long rifle as its state firearm.

In July 2014, Alaska adopted the pre-1964 Winchester Model 70 rifle as its state firearm. The bill, sponsored by Senate President Charlie Huggins, refers to the gun as the "rifleman's rifle." The bill says the gun helped Alaskans "establish a firm foothold" in the wilderness between 1930 and 1963.

In May 2021, Texas Governor Greg Abbott signed a resolution declaring the Colt Walker to be the official Texas state firearm.

Table of state firearms

See also
 Lists of United States state insignia

References

External links

1. Official Website displaying photograph of the Grouseland Rifle: http://www.grouselandfoundation.org/new.html

Firearms
United States